"Shakey Ground" is a 1975 R&B single by The Temptations. It was co-written by Funkadelic guitarist Eddie Hazel, who plays lead guitar on the song.

Background
Original Funkadelic bassist Billy "Bass" Nelson also plays on the song.

Personnel
 Lead vocals by Dennis Edwards
 Background vocals by Damon Harris, Richard Street, Melvin Franklin and Otis Williams
 Guitar by Eddie Hazel
 Bass by Billy Bass Nelson
 Soprano saxophone by Donald Charles Baldwin
 Instrumentation by various Los Angeles studio musicians

Chart history
"Shakey Ground" was the last by the group to reach the number-one spot on the Billboard Hot Soul Singles chart: the song also crossed over to the pop chart, reaching number twenty-six on the Billboard Hot 100.

Cover versions
The song has been covered by many artists:
 Van McCoy covered it for his 1975 album Disco Baby.
 Phoebe Snow recorded it for her 1976 album It Looks Like Snow.
 Renée Geyer included the song on her 1976 album Really Really Love You: Live at the Dallas Brooks Hall.
 Delbert McClinton included it on his 1980 album The Jealous Kind.
 Etta James recorded a version for her 1989 album Seven Year Itch.
 Elton John and Don Henley performed it on John's 1993 album Duets.
 Fishbone recorded the song for their 2000 album Fishbone and the Familyhood Nextperience Present: The Psychotic Friends Nuttwerx.
 Aerosmith covered it for their 2012 album Music from Another Dimension!, on which it ended up a Japanese bonus track.
 Max Creek, jam rock band, has been performing the song since the 1980s and continues to do so today.
 Founding member of the Grateful Dead, Bob Weir, has also performed the song live over 20 times; since 2012, Weir has performed the song with his bands Furthur, Ratdog, Dead & Company, Bob Weir and the Wolf Bros., as well as at solo acoustic concerts.
Bernie Marsden (formerly of Whitesnake) recorded it for his 1981 album Look At Me Now.

References

1975 singles
The Temptations songs
Renée Geyer songs
Song recordings produced by Jeffrey Bowen
Songs written by Jeffrey Bowen
1975 songs
Gordy Records singles